Club Deportivo Colegio Comercio 64 (sometimes referred as Colegio Comercio) is a Peruvian football club, playing in the city of Pucallpa, Ucayali, Peru.

History
The Club Deportivo Colegio Comercio was founded on April 14, 1987. 

In 2018 Copa Perú, the club classified to the National Stage, but was eliminated when finished in 34th place.

In 2019 Copa Perú, the club classified to the National Stage, but was eliminated by Las Palmas in the Round of 32.

In 2021 Copa Perú, the club classified to the National Stage, but was eliminated by ADT in the Fase 3 - Interregional.

Honours

Regional
Liga Departamental de Ucayali:
Winners (2): 2018, 2022
Runner-up (1): 2019

Liga Provincial de Coronel Portillo:
Winners (2): 2019, 2022
Runner-up (1): 2018

Liga Distrital de Callería:
Winners (2): 2018, 2022
Runner-up (3): 2012, 2015, 2019

See also
List of football clubs in Peru
Peruvian football league system

References

Football clubs in Peru
Association football clubs established in 1987
1987 establishments in Peru